Easy FM is a radio station in Beijing, China on 91.5 FM. It is a member of the China Radio International group of radio stations.  The programs are mostly in English (some of them being bilingual), while the commercials are in Mandarin Chinese. Internet streaming is available.

Programs
 The Beijing Hour
 China Drive
 飞鱼秀
 Music Memories
 Easy Cafe
 All That Jazz
 Sunset Boulevard
 Beat Generation
 On the Road
 The Third Wheel
 News and Reports
 The World According to Words

Hourly English-language news bulletins are broadcast throughout the day.

History
The Easy FM brand was first used in the early 1990s for a single show that was transmitted over various stations throughout mainland China. The Joy FM show continues to operate in this manner. Easy FM's hours were subsequently expanded to become an independent station. It has also occasionally been broadcast over shortwave to fill gaps in CRI's international schedules. Some Easy FM programming is simulcast in Honolulu in the American state of Hawaii over KHCM-AM.

Hosts
 Paul James - The Beijing Hour
 Shane Bigham - The Beijing Hour
 Bob Jones - The Beijing Hour
 Li Yuan, Fangzhou, Sookie, Zhong Qiu - Music Matters
 Heyang, Ryan Price, Niu Honglin - Round Table
 Xiao Fei,Mo Han - On the Road
 Nianxi, Beibei - Baby More to Learn
 Liu Yan - E Minute
 Mark Griffiths - Classic Sunday

External links
 Official Website
 CRI English
 China Radio International

References

Radio stations in China
China Radio International
Mass media in Beijing
Mass media in Shanghai